Jean Lacroix (2 December 1884 – 9 November 1971) was a French fencer. He competed in the individual and team sabre events at the 1928 Summer Olympics.

References

External links
 

1884 births
1971 deaths
French male sabre fencers
Olympic fencers of France
Fencers at the 1928 Summer Olympics